Magomed Abukarovich Paragulgov (born 26 March 1994) is a Kazakh footballer. Besides Kazakhstan, he has played in Brazil, Cyprus and Georgia.

Career

Club
On 27 February 2019, Irtysh Pavlodar announced the signing of Paragulgov.

17 February 2020, FC Kaisar announced the signing of Paragulgov.

Career statistics

Club

International

Statistics accurate as of match played 26 March 2018

References

Living people
1994 births
Kazakhstani footballers
Association football midfielders
Kazakhstan international footballers
K. Rupel Boom F.C. players
Ermis Aradippou FC players
FC Kairat players
FC Irtysh Pavlodar players
FC Kaisar players
FC Akzhayik players
FC Torpedo Kutaisi players
Kazakhstan Premier League players
Cypriot First Division players
Erovnuli Liga players
Royal Antwerp F.C. players
Kazakhstani expatriate footballers
Expatriate footballers in Belgium
Kazakhstani expatriate sportspeople in Belgium
Expatriate footballers in Brazil
Kazakhstani expatriate sportspeople in Brazil
Expatriate footballers in Cyprus
Kazakhstani expatriate sportspeople in Cyprus
Expatriate footballers in Georgia (country)
Kazakhstani expatriate sportspeople in Georgia (country)